Colin Maxwell (1917–2001) was an Australian international rugby league footballer whose career ran from the 1930s to the 1950s. He was a centre for the Australian national team in one Test in 1948 in which he captained the side.

Club career
Born in Lismore in northern New South Wales he played for Bowraville and Coffs Harbour and in Country representative sides. He joined Wests Newcastle in 1938. He came to Sydney in 1940 for one season with the St George Dragons. After World War II he played for the Western Suburbs Magpies for a season, then returned to Newcastle to captain-coach Wests Newcastle in 1946-47 before another two Sydney seasons with the Magpies in 1948–49.

War service
He spent three years from 1942 -1945 in the RAAF as a leading aircraftmen and appeared in a number of armed forces rugby league exhibition matches.

Representative career
1948 was the sole year of Maxwell's controversial representative career. His only state appearance for New South Wales was in the first match of that year's interstate series against Queensland.

When the Australian Test side was chosen for the domestic series against New Zealand Maxwell was named as a reserve back and did not figure in the Tests. He had been dropped from the New South Wales squad before the end of the interstate series and on the night the Kangaroo Tour side was announced Maxwell wasn't in Sydney with the other representative hopefuls having already left on a train bound for Newcastle. Inexplicably Maxwell was not only selected to the tour squad but was named captain and was expected to take on the duty of coaching the squad during the tour of England and France.

Whilst Maxwell was a reliable centre whose career had been interrupted by the war and injuries the mystery concerned how the incumbent Test captain Len Smith who one week earlier had led the Kangaroos to victory over New Zealand was suddenly not good enough to fit into the 28 man touring squad. Theories abounded regarding either religious bigotry from the selectors or coaching politics. See Selection controversy in Len Smith.

Due to injury and illness Maxwell did not play in the first Test loss against Great Britain at Leeds. He played in 11 minor tour matches and captained Australia in the second Test at Swinton which Great Britain won 16–7. Although Maxwell was a popular captain on Tour the match results were not good. He is listed on the Australian Players Register as Kangaroo No.262. He did not represent at state or national level again.

Maxwell's final seasons were as captain-coach of Maitland from 1950 -1952. After football, he ran a newsagency.

Sources & Footnotes
 Whiticker, Alan (2004) Captaining the Kangaroos, New Holland, Sydney
 Andrews, Malcolm (2006) The ABC of Rugby League Austn Broadcasting Corpn, Sydney

References

1917 births
2001 deaths
Australia national rugby league team captains
Australia national rugby league team players
Australian rugby league coaches
Australian rugby league players
Australian World War II pilots
Royal Australian Air Force airmen
Royal Australian Air Force personnel of World War II
Royal Australian Air Force personnel
Rugby league centres
Rugby league players from Lismore, New South Wales
St. George Dragons players
Western Suburbs Magpies coaches
Western Suburbs Magpies players
Western Suburbs Rosellas players